The L-W-F XNBS-2 was a planned 1920s biplane night bomber designed by the Lowe, Willard & Fowler Engineering Company for the United States Army Air Service.

Development 
The L-W-F XNBS-2 was a scaled-down version of the L-W-F Model H Owl mailplane. Two XNBS-2 prototypes were ordered in 1923 but the project was cancelled before construction started.

Specifications

References

Citations

Bibliography

L-W-F aircraft
1920s United States bomber aircraft